The Superior Court of California of the County of San Francisco is the state superior court with jurisdiction over the City and County of San Francisco.

History
In 1976 the Court helped to create the San Francisco Pretrial Diversion Project, a nonprofit organization that helps to provide alternative punishments for misdemeanors and parking violations, in an attempt to divert petty offenders from overcrowded courtrooms.

Judges
Katherine Feinstein (daughter of Senator Dianne Feinstein) had been the presiding judge of the court from 2011 through 2012. Judge Cynthia Ming-Mei Lee was elected the new presiding judge on June 27, 2012. The court is composed of 52 judges and twelve commissioners. The court currently has two commissioners.

In December 2016, John Stewart, chief judge at the court, discarded 66,000 arrest warrants for criminal infractions, like sleeping on the sidewalk, public urination, and public drunkenness, stating "You're putting somebody in jail because they're poor and can't pay a fine. We got a lot of criticism, but we thought it was the right thing to do."

Venue

The San Francisco County Superior Court is located at 400 McAllister St, San Francisco, CA 94102. It was opened on December 9, 1997. The building was designed by Lee/Timchula Architects. The local architect was Cavagnero and Associates.

The entrance features fabricated metal doors designed by sculptor Albert Paley.

References

External links
 

Superior Court, San Francisco County
Superior courts in California